Henry Richard Dyck (September 5, 1911 – November 15, 1993) was a professional ice hockey left winger who played one game in the National Hockey League for the New York Rangers.

Career statistics

See also
List of players who played only one game in the NHL

External links

1911 births
1993 deaths
Boston Olympics players
Canadian expatriate ice hockey players in the United States
Canadian ice hockey left wingers
Ice hockey people from Saskatchewan
Johnstown Blue Birds players
Kansas City Americans players
Kansas City Greyhounds players
New York Rangers players
North West Hockey League players
Sportspeople from Saskatoon
Tulsa Oilers (AHA) players